In natural languages, an indicative conditional is a conditional sentence such as "If Leona is at home, she isn't in Paris", whose grammatical form restricts it to discussing what could be true. Indicatives are typically defined in opposition to counterfactual conditionals, which have extra grammatical marking which allows them to discuss eventualities which are no longer possible.

Indicatives are a major topic of research in philosophy of language, philosophical logic, and linguistics. Open questions include which logical operation indicatives denote, how such denotations could be composed from their grammatical form, and the implications of those denotations for areas including metaphysics, psychology of reasoning, and philosophy of mathematics.

Formal analyses

Early analyses identified indicative conditionals with the logical operation known as the material conditional. According to the material conditional analysis, an indicative "If A then B" is true unless A is true and B is not. Although this analysis covers many observed cases, it misses some crucial properties of actual conditional speech and reasoning.

One problem for the material conditional analysis is that it allows indicatives to be true even when their antecedent and consequent are unrelated. For instance, the indicative "If Paris is in France then trout are fish" is intuitively strange since the location of Paris has nothing to do with the classification of trout. However, since its antecedent and the consequent are both true, the material conditional analysis treats it as a true statement. Similarly, the material conditional analysis treats conditionals with false antecedents as vacuously true. For instance, since Paris is not in Australia, the conditional "If Paris is in Australia, then trout are fish" would be treated as true on a material conditional analysis. These arguments have been taken to show that no truth-functional operator will suffice as a semantics for indicative conditionals. In the mid-20th century, work by H.P. Grice, Frank Cameron Jackson, and others attempted to maintain the material conditional conditional as an analysis of indicatives' literal semantic denotation, while appealing to pragmatics in order to explain the apparent discrepancies.

Contemporary work in philosophical logic and formal semantics generally proposes alternative denotations for indicative conditionals. Proposed alternatives include analyses based on relevance logic, modal logic, probability theory, Kratzerian modal semantics, and dynamic semantics.

Psychology
Most behavioral experiments on conditionals in the psychology of reasoning have been carried out with indicative conditionals, causal conditionals,  and counterfactual conditionals. People readily make the modus ponens inference, that is,  given if A then B, and given A, they conclude B, but only about half of participants in experiments make the modus tollens inference, that is,  given if A then B, and given not-B, only about half of participants conclude not-A, the remainder say that nothing follows (Evans et al., 1993). When participants are given counterfactual conditionals, they make both the modus ponens and the modus tollens inferences (Byrne, 2005).

See also

 Counterfactual conditional
 Logical consequence
 Material conditional
 Strict conditional

References

Further reading 
 Byrne, R.M.J. (2005). The Rational Imagination: How People Create Counterfactual Alternatives to Reality. Cambridge, MA: MIT Press.
 Edgington, Dorothy. (2006). "Conditionals". The Stanford Encyclopedia of Philosophy, Edward Zalta (ed.). http://plato.stanford.edu/entries/conditionals/.
 Evans, J. St. B. T.,  Newstead, S. and Byrne, R. M. J. (1993). Human Reasoning: The Psychology of Deduction.  Hove, Psychology Press.

Conditionals in linguistics
Logical connectives
Reasoning